Noville Peninsula is a high ice-covered peninsula about 30 nautical miles (60 km) long, between Peale and Murphy Inlets on the north side of Thurston Island in Antarctica. It was delineated from aerial photographs made by U.S. Navy Operation HIGHJUMP in December 1946, and named for George O. Noville, executive officer of the Byrd Antarctic Expedition, 1933–35.

The northern extremity of the peninsula (and Thurston Island overall) is ice-covered Cape LeBlanc. Severely injured, LeBlanc was among the six of nine aboard that survived the crash. They were rescued on January 12, 1947, by Lieutenant Commander John D. Howell, who landed a PBM in open water off the northwest edge of Noville Peninsula. The west extremity of the peninsula, ice-covered Rescue Point, is so-named because the survivors were rescued there.

The eastern extremity of the peninsula is Black Crag, a small steep cliff rock exposure just south of small Mulroy Island. It was delineated from aerial photographs taken by U.S. Navy Squadron VX-6 in January 1960, and named by the Advisory Committee on Antarctic Names for George H. Black, a supply officer of the Byrd Antarctic Expedition in 1928–30.

Mount Feury is a peak on the northeast side of the peninsula, between Sikorski Glacier and Frankenfield Glacier.

Maps
 Thurston Island – Jones Mountains. 1:500000 Antarctica Sketch Map. US Geological Survey, 1967.
 Antarctic Digital Database (ADD). Scale 1:250000 topographic map of Antarctica. Scientific Committee on Antarctic Research (SCAR), 1993–2016.

References 

Peninsulas of Ellsworth Land
Thurston Island